Say Something (full title Say Something Say Something Say Something) is the first full-length album by the American indie pop band Via Audio. It was released on September 25, 2007, by indie Sidecho Records in the United States and Kurofone Records in Japan.

Critical reception
The Pitch called the album "a blanket of fuzzy pop to warm the blustery days ahead." Paste praised the "conclusive" and "strongly-willed" songs, calling them a departure from indie-rock song-writing norms.

Track listing
 "Developing Active People" – 3:31
 "Modern Day Saint" – 4:19
 "Harder on Me" – 3:14
 "Numb" – 3:50
 "We Can Be Good" – 4:41
 "Presents" - 3:32
 "From Clouds" – 3:36
 "Enunciation" – 3:35
 "Collaboration" – 4:42
 "I Can't Focus" – 3:49
 "Hazmat" – 3:09

The names for tracks 10 & 11 were mixed up on the release of the album.

References

External links 
 Via Audio official website
 Sidecho Records official website

2007 debut albums
Via Audio albums